A multifunctional peptide is a peptide which occurs when two genes band together. This process gives new properties to the polypeptide.

Peptides